Louis Eugene Allen (July 12, 1924 – April 16, 2008) was a professional gridiron football offensive lineman in the National Football League (NFL) and the Canadian Football League (CFL). In the early 1950s, Allen played for the Pittsburgh Steelers of the NFL and the Montreal Alouettes of the CFL. He played only one game with the Alouettes in the 1952 CFL season.

References

External links
 

1924 births
2008 deaths
American football offensive tackles
Players of Canadian football from North Carolina
Duke Blue Devils football players
Montreal Alouettes players
Pittsburgh Steelers players
Sportspeople from Greensboro, North Carolina
Players of American football from North Carolina
Grimsley High School alumni